Eleven Men in Flight is a Eswatini soccer club based in Siteki.

Achievements
Premier League of Eswatini: 2
 1994, 1996.

Swazi Cup: 2
 1993, 2001.

Swazi Charity Cup: 1
 1996.

Swazi Challenge Cup: 3
 1993, 1996, 2001.

Performance in CAF competitions
African Cup of Champions Clubs: 1 appearance
1995 – First Round

CAF Cup: 1 appearance
1996 – Preliminary Round

CAF Cup Winners' Cup: 2 appearances
1994 – Second Round
1997 – First Round

References

Association football clubs established in 1969
Football clubs in Eswatini